Sevenig may refer to two municipalities in the district Bitburg-Prüm, Rhineland-Palatinate, Germany:

Sevenig (Our), part of the Verbandsgemeinde Arzfeld
Sevenig bei Neuerburg, part of the Verbandsgemeinde Südeifel